Noel Douglas Rayson (24 May 1933 – 11 February 2003) was an Australian rules footballer who played with Geelong and South Melbourne during his ten-year career in the Victorian Football League (VFL).

Rayson joined Geelong at the age of 16, and was just past his 17th birthday when he played his first senior game. He played few games during his first few seasons, as Geelong had won successive flags. He also twice represented Victoria.

He won the VFL Leading Goal-kicker award in 1955 with 77 goals.

References

External links

1933 births
2003 deaths
Australian rules footballers from Geelong
Geelong Football Club players
Sydney Swans players
Coleman Medal winners
Newtown & Chilwell Football Club players